Venclova is a Lithuanian surname. Notable people with the surname include:

Antanas Venclova (1906–1971), Soviet Lithuanian poet, journalist and translator
Tomas Venclova (born 1937), Lithuanian writer, translator, and poet

Lithuanian-language surnames